Hollywood Residential is an American sitcom created by and starring Adam Paul. It was originally broadcast on the Starz network in the United States in 2008.

Paul plays Tony King, an aspiring actor who had come up with an idea for a reality show in the style of This Old House in which each episode focused on his making improvements to the home of a Hollywood celebrity. Each episode featured a celebrity playing himself or herself.

Recurring themes include Tony's incompetence, his obsession with his ex-wife, and his simultaneous jealousy of and attraction for his co-host, Lila.

Tony's ex-wife Rachael was played by Rachael Harris. Adam Paul and Rachael Harris were married in real life and they divorced soon after the initial broadcast of Hollywood Residential.

Cast
Adam Paul as Tony King
Lindsey Stoddart as Lila Mann
David Ramsey as Don Merritt
Eric Allan Kramer as Pete
Carrie Clifford as Carrie
Rachael Harris as Rachael
Catherine Reitman as Abbey
Melissa Bacelar as Scarlett Jo Ramson
Patrick Gallo as Tom "The Hammer" Stern
Kurt Fuller as Chet

Episodes

References

External links

2000s American single-camera sitcoms
2008 American television series debuts
2008 American television series endings
Starz original programming
English-language television shows